Brigadier William Richard Mundell  was the penultimate 'Colonel of the Regiment' of the Duke of Wellington's Regiment (West Riding), before their amalgamation into the Yorkshire Regiment, 3rd Battalion (Duke of Wellington's).

Military career
Mundell was commissioned into the Duke of Wellington's Regiment (West Riding) on 19 December 1958. He commanded his regiment on deployment in Northern Ireland in spring 1982 for which he was appointed an Officer of the Order of the British Empire.
 
He became commander of 6th Armoured Brigade in January 1983, Deputy Commander, North East District in July 1986 and Brigadier, Infantry for British Army of the Rhine in April 1988. He became colonel of the Duke of Wellington's Regiment (West Riding) in 1990.

References

Living people
British Army generals
Officers of the Order of the British Empire
Year of birth missing (living people)